The AT&T Madison Complex Tandem Office is a  17-story,  building in Los Angeles, California, completed in 1961. The building serves 1.3 million phone lines in area code 213, and other Los Angeles area codes, for foreign long-distance calling.

See also
List of tallest buildings in Los Angeles

References

Further reading
 
 
 

AT&T buildings
Communication towers in the United States
Skyscraper office buildings in Los Angeles
Buildings and structures in Downtown Los Angeles
Telephone exchange buildings
Telecommunications buildings in the United States
Office buildings completed in 1961
Towers completed in 1961
1961 establishments in California
1960s architecture in the United States